This is a list of films which have reached number one at the weekend box office in Taipei, Taiwan during 2018.

Films

See also 
 2018 Taiwanese films
 List of highest-grossing films in Taiwan

References

External links 
Taipei Weekend Box Office Chart for 2018 @movies

2018
Taipei
2018 in Taiwan